Richard Rice may refer to:
 Richard Rice (abbot) fl. 1530s
 Richard Rice (theologian) (born 1944), Seventh-day Adventist theologian and author
 Richard Rice (athlete) (1886–1939), British track and field athlete
 Richard H. Rice (1863–1922), American mechanical engineer and inventor
 Richard P. Rice, 19th century Newfoundland merchant, politician and magistrate

See also
 Ricky Rice (born 1951), American wrestler